Gale Ann Benson (née Plugge; 4 November 1944 – 2 January 1972) was a British model, socialite and daughter of Conservative MP Leonard Plugge. She was stabbed and buried alive in Trinidad and Tobago.

Life

Benson was born 4 November 1944 in London to Leonard and Ann Plugge. Gale had two brothers, Leonard Frank (born 1937), and Greville, her twin. She attended school at the Lycée Français in London. Later she started modelling, and worked as a DJ for a French radio show.

She married film director Jonathan Benson at the age of 20, but the marriage had difficulties and she moved to Argentina in 1967 when she was 22. Returning to the United Kingdom she started a relationship with Black Power activist Hakim Jamal, an associate of Michael X. Jamal was an American from Boston whose previous name was Allen Donaldson. She changed her name to "Hale Kimga", an anagram of her first name and Hakim.

Benson and Jamal moved to Guyana in 1971, before moving later that year to the commune in Trinidad and Tobago of Michael X, who had fled the UK while bailed on charges of extortion and robbery.

Murder
On the morning of 2 January 1972, Benson was stabbed 10 times and buried alive by Stanley Abbot and Edward Chadee. Her body was found in a shallow grave near the home of Michael X. It was alleged that Michael X had ordered her death because she was causing "mental strain" to Jamal.

Her badly decomposed body was found seven weeks later, and eventually two of the men were convicted of her murder, after one of the group turned witness for the prosecution. Stanley Abbott and Edward Chadee were sentenced to death, but one was commuted to life imprisonment. Another of the group drowned at sea, and barber Joseph Skerritt was murdered. Michael X was charged with Benson's murder but never tried; he was sentenced to death for the murder of Skerritt on 21 August 1972, and hanged in Port of Spain's Royal Gaol in May 1975. Her lover Hakim Jamal was murdered in the United States in 1973, just over a year after Benson.

Cultural references
The movie The Bank Job (2008) portrays Michael X as having been in possession of indecent photographs of Princess Margaret stored in a bank vault, and using them to blackmail the British establishment. Hattie Morahan plays Benson, whom the film portrays as a spy whose role is to find any additional photos or negatives Michael X may have.

Benson is a central character in Diana Athill's memoir of her friendship with Gale's lover, Hakim Jamal, Make Believe: A True Story.

References

1944 births
1972 deaths
British people murdered abroad
Deaths by live burial
English female models
Models from London
People murdered in Trinidad and Tobago
1972 in Trinidad and Tobago
1972 murders in North America
Violence against women in Trinidad and Tobago